The College of Flying Training (CFT) is located at Risalpur, Nowshera District, Khyber-Pakhtunkhwa, Pakistan. The College is a constituent unit of the Pakistan Air Force Academy and affiliated with Air University (Islamabad). College of Flying training consists of four flying training squadrons, which include Basic Flying Training squadron, Primary Flying Training squadron, Advance Jet Training squadron, and Flying Instructor School.

Academics
The college offers undergraduate programs in BS (Aviation Sciences and Management) with specialization in Fighter, Light Communication Aircraft, Helicopter, Air Defence, Air Traffic Control, Logistics.

External links
PAF Falcons Base

Military academies of Pakistan
Universities and colleges in Nowshera District